Fufe Bohutsana Providence Makatong is a South African politician and the Northern Cape MEC for Roads and Public Works. She was appointed to the position on 26 June 2020. She has served as a member of the Northern Cape Provincial Legislature since 12 June 2020, and previously from 2014 to 2019. Between 2018 and 2019, she was the MEC for Health. Makatong is the treasurer of the provincial African National Congress structure.

Political career
In 2014, Makatong was elected to the Northern Cape Provincial Legislature as a member of the African National Congress.

She was elected as provincial treasurer at the ANC's elective conference in May 2017.

In a cabinet reshuffle in February 2018, Makatong was appointed as the Member of the Executive Council (MEC) for Health by premier Sylvia Lucas. She took over from Lebogang Motlhaping. She was not placed on the ANC's list for the 2019 general election and left the legislature at the dissolution of the term.

Makatong returned to the legislature on 12 June 2020. Soon after, she was appointed MEC for Roads and Public Works by the new premier, Zamani Saul. The Democratic Alliance, an opposition party, criticised her appointment.

References

External links

Living people
Year of birth missing (living people)
Tswana people
People from the Northern Cape
African National Congress politicians
Members of the Northern Cape Provincial Legislature